The California sea hare (Aplysia californica) is a species of sea slug in the sea hare family, Aplysiidae. It is found in the Pacific Ocean, off the coast of California in the United States and northwestern Mexico.

Distribution
A. californica is found along the coast of California, United States, and northwestern Mexico (including the Gulf of California).

Description
The maximum length recorded for the California sea hare is  when crawling, thus fully extended, although most adult specimens are half this size or smaller. A closely related species, Aplysia vaccaria, the black sea hare, can grow to be larger still.

A California sea hare is typically reddish-brown to greenish-brown, but the color varies based on the algae it ingests. Each sea hare houses four tentacles, with two on the head sheltering the eyes, and two on the face surrounding the mouth. The body has two folds, called parapodia, which envelop the gills for protection but enable water to get by. Below the body is a muscle that allows for mobility, almost like a foot. The California sea hare also has an internal shell to protect its organs.

Lifecycle
Like all sea hares, the California sea hare is hermaphroditic, acting as male and female simultaneously during mating. A. californica is known to form mating chains with up to 20 animals. The eggs are yellow-green, and change after 8–9 days into a brown color before larvae hatch. Mating is most prominent during the summer  following the rise of the water temperature to 17 °C.

A. californica has a generation time of 19 weeks: Days 1-37 after hatching from the egg comprise the planktonic stage, days 34-37 are the metamorphic stage, and days 45-80 are the juvenile stage. At about day 30, the larvae move on from the planktonic stage and begin to roost on algae, typically red algae. The larvae eat enough to double their weight every 10 days for the following 3 months while they undergo metamorphosis. Reproductive maturity is reached 85 days after hatching (133 days after deposition of the fertilized eggs). The development of the nervous system lasts for 140 days. Often times, the California sea hare dies shortly after laying eggs. Cooler temperatures (14-25° C, or 57-77° F) delay spawning and have been shown to extend the lifespan.

Sexual reproduction
At the base of the right anterior tentacle is the aperture from which the penis can protrude. The genital aperture lies at the anterior end of the mantle cavity, a seminal grove arises from it and runs forward to the penis, at the base of the anterior tentacle.

Coupling lasts for hours or sometimes for days, although the actual passage of the sperm may take only a few minutes. Egg laying normally has to be triggered by copulation, but it occurs spontaneously in individuals kept in isolation for up to 3–4 months (typically these eggs are unfertilized). Copulation occurs most frequently in the early morning, and only rarely after 12:30 pm. An individual animal weighing 2,600g was recorded to have laid about 500 million eggs at 27 separate times during less than five months.

Feeding habits
Like all Aplysia species, the California sea hare is herbivorous. Its diet consists primarily of red algae such as  Laurencia pacifica, Plocamium pacificum, and Ceramium eatonianum, which give the animal its typically reddish or pinkish coloration. Some California sea hares will appear more brown, which helps them blend into their surroundings.  A. californica resembles the food on which it grazes, and cannot be distinguished easily from the seaweed unless the animal is moving. When the sea hares eat algae, they consume toxins, which they store in themselves to repel predators.  They can also release these toxins as a purple ink, which will also discourage predators from attacking them.

Predators

Because of the toxins in its body that come from consuming algae, the California sea hare has very few predators. Predators include starfish, lobsters, and the ophistobranch Navanax inermis which will take juveniles.

When it is considerably disturbed, the sea hare is capable of releasing two different kinds of ink from different locations within its mantle cavity, much in the way an octopus does. One ink is reddish-purple and comes from what is called the purple ink gland, while the other is milky white, comes from what is called the opaline gland, and contains the aversive chemical opaline.

Protective mechanisms
Inking provides protection from spiny lobsters, a major predator of sea hares, by means of three mechanisms: chemical deterrence, sensory disruption, and phagomimicry.

The typical defence response of the sea hare to a predator is the release of chemicals such as free amino acids, ink from the ink gland, and opaline from the opaline gland. Chemical deterrence involves the release of toxic chemicals that are noxious to predators and rapidly dissuades them from feeding. Ink creates a dark, diffuse cloud in the water that disrupts the sensory perception of the predator by acting as a screen or decoy. The opaline, which affects the senses dealing with feeding, causes the predator to instinctively attack the cloud of chemicals as if it were indeed food.

Laboratory use
A. californica has become a valuable laboratory animal, used in studies of the neurobiology of learning and memory, and is especially associated with the work of Nobel laureate Eric Kandel.

Its ubiquity in synaptic plasticity studies can be attributed to its simple nervous system, consisting of just 20,000 large, easily identified neurons with cell bodies up to 1 mm in size. Despite its seemingly simple nervous system, though, A. californica is capable of a variety of nonassociative and associative learning tasks, including sensitization, habituation, and classical and operant conditioning. Study typically involves a reduced preparation of the gill and siphon withdrawal reflex.

Sequencing of its whole genome was approved as a priority by National Human Genome Research Institute in March 2005.
The draft genome is available on the UCSC Genome browser.

References

 Beeman R.D. (1963) Notes on the California species of Aplysia (Gastropoda: Opisthobranchia). The Veliger 5(4): 145–147.
 Bebbington A. (1977) Aplysiid species from Eastern Australia with notes on the Pacific Ocean Aplysiomorpha (Gastropoda, Opisthobranchia). Transactions of the Zoological Society of London 34: 87-147
 Turgeon, D.D.; Quinn, J.F.; Bogan, A.E.; Coan, E.V.; Hochberg, F.G.; Lyons, W.G.; Mikkelsen, P.M.; Neves, R.J.; Roper, C.F.E.; Rosenberg, G.; Roth, B.; Scheltema, A.; Thompson, F.G.; Vecchione, M.; Williams, J.D. (1998). Common and scientific names of aquatic invertebrates from the United States and Canada: mollusks. 2nd ed. American Fisheries Society Special Publication, 26. American Fisheries Society: Bethesda, MD (USA). . IX, 526 + cd-rom pp.
 NIH/University of Miami National Resource for Aplysia Facility

Further reading
 
  Moroz L. L., Ju J., Russo J. J., Puthanveetti S., Kohn A., Medina M., Walsh P. J., Birren B., Lander E. S. & Kandel E. R. (2004) "Sequencing the Aplysia Genome: a model for single cell, real-time and comparative genomics". National Human Genome Research Institute. online at http://www.genome.gov/Pages/Research/Sequencing/SeqProposals/AplysiaSeq.pdf Accessed 20 November 2009
 
 

Aplysia
Gastropods described in 1863
Taxa named by James Graham Cooper
Animal models
Articles containing video clips
Marine molluscs of North America
Molluscs of the Pacific Ocean
Fauna of California
Marine fauna of the Gulf of California